Freimut Duve (26 November 1936 – 3 March 2020) was a German journalist, writer, politician and human rights activist. From 1980 to 1998 he was a member of the Bundestag for the Social Democratic Party of Germany (SPD). He was the first OSCE Representative on Freedom of the Media from 1998 to 2003. Duve was also a well-known personality in the German literary scene.

Life 
Born in Würzburg on 26 November 1936, Duve grew up in Hamburg. He studied history, English literature and sociology at the University of Hamburg. In 1961, he studied Britain's colonial history in South Africa and Zimbabwe. He was the supervisor of foreign students at the University of Hamburg in 1965.

He campaigned for the party together with Günter Grass and Siegfried Lenz. He worked as a political journalist for Stern magazine from 1969, and as an editor for Rowohlt Verlag from 1970 to 1989, responsible for a series of political books, among others. He published political writings by Václav Havel, a manifesto against dictatorship in Portugal by Mário Soares, and yearbooks on human rights in Central and East Europe, among others. Duve was a member of the Bundestag for the SPD, directly elected by the Hamburg-Mitte electoral district, from 1980 to 1998.

He was the first OSCE Representative on Freedom of the Media until 2003, being succeeded by Miklós Haraszti.

Duve died in Hamburg on 3 March 2020.

Publications 
Duve's publications include:

As author
 Der Rassenkrieg findet nicht statt. Entwicklungspolitik zwischen Angst und Armut. Econ, Düsseldorf 1971, .
 Vom Krieg in der Seele. Rücksichten eines Deutschen. Rowohlt, Reinbek 1998, .
 Kulturpolitik, auswärtig. In: Robert Picht u. a. (ed.): Fremde Freunde. Deutsche und Franzosen vor dem 21. Jahrhundert. Piper, München 2002, pp. 377–383.

As editor
 Kap ohne Hoffnung oder Die Politik der Apartheid. Rowohlt, Reinbek 1965.
 Die Restauration entläßt ihre Kinder oder Der Erfolg der Rechten in der Bundesrepublik. Rowohlt, Reinbek 1968.
 Technologie und Politik. Das Magazin zur Wachstumskrise. Reinbek No. 1/1975 to No. 16/1980.
 Aufbrüche. Die Chronik der Republik 1961 bis 1986. (together with ). Rowohlt, Reinbek 1988, .

Awards 
Duve was presented the Hannah Arendt Award for Political Thought in 1997, together with Joachim Gauck. He was awarded the Order of Merit of the Federal Republic of Germany in 2004.

References

External links 

 

1936 births
2020 deaths
Organization for Security and Co-operation in Europe
United Nations special rapporteurs
Politicians from Würzburg
Members of the Bundestag for Hamburg
Members of the Bundestag 1994–1998
Members of the Bundestag 1990–1994
German officials of the United Nations
Commanders Crosses of the Order of Merit of the Federal Republic of Germany
Members of the Bundestag for the Social Democratic Party of Germany